Siphesihle Siswana, (born 30 December 1995) in Durban better known by his stage name Garde is a South African singer, songwriter, and producer. He started singing at the tender age of 6 years, his first ever performance was in a concert at his primary school. After graduating from High School he studied Business Law which he later quit pursuing a career in music. Garde was born into a family with artists, some of his elder relatives being musicians, choreographers, and visual artists. As a young boy, Siphesihle spent a lot of time with his maternal uncles Duze Mahlobo who is a legendary and internationally recognized jazz guitarist, and Wake Mahlobo who is also an internationally recognized drummer; this got the young Siphesihle interested in music and he started experimenting with the art form. As he grew up, he sharpened his songwriting skills and worked with a number of producers in Durban. Garde was battling to find a producer that gave him the sound he wanted, so he enrolled at a COPA to study music. It was only a matter of time until he was able to produce, mix and master his own music – from then on, it was history being written with every song being recorded.

Garde did not complete his qualification at COPA because he had to perform cover songs only and was not allowed to perform his original compositions. After quitting school yet again, his focus went to producing his first solo project which was a 3 Track EP, titled ‘WOMEN EPILOGUE’ the project was released for free download in October 2015. Most of the production work was done on his iPad but the final project was recorded at Cosher Recording Studios in Cape Town, South Africa. As a follow-up to his Women Epilogue debut mixtape, Garde released The Healer EP in winter of 2016, the project showed growth in his artistry and his maturity as a musician. The sound is refreshing and takes the listener on a fun musical journey that is meant to heal and uplift the spirit. Garde has carved out a niche for himself in the music scene and has won the hearts of many fans. He created his own genre which he named Neo-Drum and music lovers in Durban (and nationally) have welcomed this sound with warm hearts and open minds. His subject matter is simple and honest, thus making his music universal and can be listened to by people of all backgrounds, races, and ages. His voice is unique and he has a distinct tone that makes him easily identifiable. Garde has been performing at Café's and live music venues in Durban and Gauteng winning his fans hearts one-by-one, beat-by-beat

Garde has achieved a lot in his very young and promising career in the music industry.

• In October 2017, he performed at YFM’s Live and Rewired event which was broadcast live on air.

• Has performed on Gagasi FM’s Unplugged Sundays with Collen Zondo – Urban Soul Radio

• Has had the pleasure of opening for the Afro-Pop legend, Ntando Bangani at the 2017 KZN Music Imbizo Showcases at The Jazzy Rainbow in Durban.

• Has shared the stage with S.A.’s biggest stars performing at some of Durban's biggest events and festivals such as Durban Braai Day, Durban Picnic Day, Nasty C’s Ivyson Tour and many more others.

• Has received his fair share of radio and TV exposure, having most of his collaborations playlisted on radio and music television channels. Neo-Drum has also received a co-sign and spark interest from the likes of Khuli Chana.

Garde has also had the opportunity to produce, write songs for and collaborate with many high profile and upcoming musicians. You can see more on these collaborations below.

• Kyle Deutsche ft Mnqodi Yazi – Now That We’re Talking - https://goo.gl/Srbg1K - Produced by Garde

• Aewon Wolf, Chris Snakes & Garde – Saucy Things - https://goo.gl/mBos2e ; Produced by Garde

• Aewon Wolf, Earl Evans & Garde – Feelings - https://goo.gl/MHrAfe - Produced by Garde & Earl Evans

• Aewon Wolf, Lil Parker, Earl Evans, Khumz & Garde – Grounded - https://goo.gl/o3zRuw - Produced by Garde

• Garde is currently producing and working on music for Kaien Cruz, Kyle Deutsche, Aewon Wolf, Khuli Chana and Idol's Top 8 finalist Tee Xaba.

Places
Garde, Spain, town and municipality in Navarre, Spain
Garde, Tibet, village in Tibet
Gârde, a village in Bistra Commune, Alba County, Romania
Gärde, an area in the north of Offerdal, Jämtland, Sweden
Garde, Gotland, a settlement on the Swedish island of Gotland

Other uses
Garde (surname)
Škoda Garde, car produced by Škoda Auto

See also
Bière de Garde, farmhouse beer style from Northern France
La Garde (disambiguation)
Lagarde (disambiguation)
Legarde (disambiguation)
LGarde (company)